Paul Robert Kenward (born 1973) is a British businessman, managing director of British Sugar and a director of several other companies.

He is the husband of the British Conservative MP Victoria Atkins.

Born in the Royal Borough of Greenwich, Kenward was educated at Lady Margaret Hall, Oxford, and was President of the Oxford Union in the Trinity term of 1996. Kenward's directorships include British Sugar, Pride Oils PLC, Westmill Foods, BE International Foods, Seedcote Systems Ltd., Germain's (UK) Ltd., the Wereham Gravel Company, ABF Grain Products, Mitra Sugar, Davjon Food and others.

In May 2018 it was reported that Kenward was operating Britain's largest legal cannabis farm. His company produces a non-psychoactive variety of the drug which is used in children's epilepsy medicine. His wife, Victoria Atkins, announced that she would no longer be speaking for the government on cannabis and some other aspects of her drugs brief, with the Home Office commenting that she had "voluntarily recused herself from policy or decisions relating to cannabis".

References

Living people
1973 births
People from Greenwich
Alumni of Lady Margaret Hall, Oxford
Presidents of the Oxford Union
British food industry businesspeople
Businesspeople in the sugar industry
Businesspeople in the cannabis industry